High on the Hog: How African American Cuisine Transformed America is a 2021 docuseries released on Netflix on May 26, 2021, starring Stephen Satterfield, Gabrielle E.W. Carter and Jessica B. Harris. In August 2021, the series was renewed for a second season.

Osayi Endolyn, in The New York Times, stated the television series was "sorely overdue."

It is based on the book High on the Hog: A Culinary Journey from Africa to America.

Cast 
 Stephen Satterfield
 Gabrielle E.W. Carter
 Jessica B. Harris
 Romuald Hazoumé

Episodes

Season 1 (2021)

References

External links 
 
 

2021 American television series debuts
2020s American documentary television series
Netflix original documentary television series
English-language Netflix original programming
Food and drink television series

Accolades
2021 Peabody Award Winner